Pat Holtz (born 27 November 1968) is a Scottish professional pool player.

Career

Early life
He was born in Hamilton, Scotland and comes from a family of three older brothers and one younger sister, and has one daughter. Holtz has been playing pool for over twenty years and won many major honours in the game both at UK and American pool.

Playing career
In UK pool he has been the number one ranked played in Scotland and top eight ranked player in the World (WEPF) rankings. Since taking up American pool in January 2006 he has gone on to be Scottish 9-Ball champion.

During the 2006 WPA Men's World Nine-ball Championship he won his group with three wins from three in the group stages, the round of 64 and the round of 32, but was eliminated in the round of 16 by Wu Chia-ching, the defending champion. This performance secured him a spot in the 2007 edition of the tournament, but he declined his invite.

In June 2007, he was one of 16 players invited by Matchroom Sport to compete in the World Pool Masters in the Netherlands. He won games over Li He-Wen (China) and later an 8–5 victory over European top seed Niels Feijen (the Netherlands) before bowing out the event 8–5 to Mosconi Cup player David Alcaide (Spain).

He was the PPPO World Eight-ball Champion in 1996.

External links
 Pat Holtz list of Honours
 World Pool Masters, profile of Pat Holtz
 World 9 Ball Pool Championships, Pat Holtz profile
 World Cup of Pool, team Scotland profile
 Scottish Pool Association Rankings, No. 1 player Pat Holtz
 Scottish American Pool Players Association Rankings, No1 player Pat Holtz
 Ireland's 9 Ball Tour, Hall of Fame, Pat Holtz profile
 World Eightball Pool Federation (WEPF), player rankings, No. 6 Pat Holtz

Scottish pool players
Living people
World champions in pool
Sportspeople from Hamilton, South Lanarkshire
1968 births